Hans Holmboe (8 October 1798 – 23 May 1868) was a Norwegian educator and politician.

Personal life
He was born in Trondenes as the son of bailiff Jens Holmboe (1752–1804) and his wife Anna Margrethe Irgens (1766–1851). He had several brothers and sisters. His brothers Even and Leonhard Christian became involved in politics, so did his nephew Jens Holmboe.

In 1825 he married Welgjerd Endriette Løberg, who hailed from Kongsberg. The couple had four daughters and three sons.

Career
He was elected to the Norwegian Parliament in 1833, representing the constituency of Bergen. He was re-elected in 1836, 1842, 1848, 1851, 1859 and 1862. He was especially known for his work with Henrik Wergeland and others to grant Jews the right to enter Norway.

He worked as a school principal at Bergen Cathedral School. He was also editor-in-chief of Bergens Stiftstidende for some time.

He died in 1868 in Sande.

References

1798 births
1868 deaths
Members of the Storting
Politicians from Bergen
Norwegian educators
Hans
Opposition to antisemitism in Europe